Pulchrana mangyanum is a species of "true frog", family Ranidae. It is endemic to the Philippines and occurs on Mindoro, Sibay, and Semirara islands. Prior to its description in 2002, Pulchrana mangyanum was confused with Pulchrana signata.

Etymology
The specific name mangyanum refers to the Mangyan, indigenous people of Mindoro.

Description
Adult males measure  and adult females  in snout–vent length. the snout is obtusely rounded and moderately elongate. The eyes are large and protuberant. The  tympanum is distinct. The fingers have moderately large discs but no webbing. The toes are long and bear discs that are larger than those on the fingers; webbing is present. Coloration is highly variable. Middorsal surfaces, head and rostrum range from being nearly homogeneous black or very dark brown to having  golden yellow or brown diffuse central blotches. Dorsolateral lines vary in thickness (generally thicker in females than in males), shape (sometimes nearly straight, but typically irregular), and color (solid grey, tan, or golden yellow, or with small round brown spots).

Habitat and conservation
Pulchrana mangyanum inhabits and breeds in undisturbed and disturbed streams and rivers in lower montane and lowland forests at elevations below . Males call perched on rocks or ledges, or concealed within grassy edges of banks, always within a half a meter of the stream's edge. The tadpoles develop in quiet side-pools in rivers.

Though occurring in disturbed areas, it does not tolerate much habitat disturbance and is considered threatened by shifting, slash-and-burn agriculture and small-scale wood collection by local settlements. However, it can still be locally common. It is present in some protected areas on Mindoro.

References

mangyanum
Amphibians of the Philippines
Endemic fauna of the Philippines
Amphibians described in 2002
Taxa named by Rafe M. Brown